Crenicichla alta is a species of cichlid native to South America. It is found in the Amazon River basin, in the Branco River basin, Brazil and the Essequibo River basin, Guyana.

References

Kullander, S.O., 2003. Cichlidae (Cichlids). p. 605-654. In R.E. Reis, S.O. Kullander and C.J. Ferraris, Jr. (eds.) Checklist of the Freshwater Fishes of South and Central America. Porto Alegre: EDIPUCRS, Brasil. 

alta
Freshwater fish of Brazil
Fish of Guyana
Fish of the Amazon basin
Taxa named by Carl H. Eigenmann
Fish described in 1912